The 1996–97 FIBA EuroLeague was the 40th installment of the European top-tier level professional club competition for basketball clubs (now called simply EuroLeague). It was organized by FIBA Europe. It began on September 19, 1996, and ended on April 24, 1997. The competition's Final Four was held at Rome.

In the previous 5 seasons of the competition, the competition's official name was FIBA European League, or shortened to FIBA EuroLeague. This season was the first edition of the competition that took the shortened name of FIBA EuroLeague, as the league's official name.

Competition system
24 teams (the national domestic league champions from the best leagues, and a variable number of other clubs from the most important national domestic leagues). The competition culminated in a Final Four.

Teams

Country ranking
For the 1996–1997 EuroLeague, the countries are allocated places according to their place on the FIBA country rankings, which takes into account their performance in European competitions from 1993–94 to 1995–96.

Team allocation

First round

Second round
(The individual scores and standings of the First stage are accumulated in the Second stage)

If one or more clubs are level on won-lost record, tiebreakers are applied in the following order:
Head-to-head record in matches between the tied clubs
Overall point difference in games between the tied clubs
Overall point difference in all group matches (first tiebreaker if tied clubs are not in the same group)
Points scored in all group matches
Sum of quotients of points scored and points allowed in each group match

Top 16

|}

Quarterfinals

|}

Final four

Semifinals
April 22, Palaeur, Rome

|}

3rd place game
April 24, Palaeur, Rome

|}

Final
April 24, Palaeur, Rome

|}

Final standings

Awards

FIBA EuroLeague Top Scorer
 Carlton Myers ( Fortitudo Bologna)

FIBA EuroLeague Final Four MVP
 David Rivers ( Olympiacos)

FIBA EuroLeague Finals Top Scorer
 David Rivers ( Olympiacos)

FIBA EuroLeague All-Final Four Team

References

External links
1996–97 FIBA EuroLeague
1996–97 FIBA EuroLeague
Eurobasket.com 1996–97 FIBA EuroLeague

 
1996–1997